Hermanus Bernadus Groenewald is a South African politician who served as a Member of the National Assembly between 2015 and 2019. Prior to his tenure in the National Assembly, he was a permanent delegate to the National Council of Provinces from the North West from 2009 to 2015. Groenewald is a member of the Democratic Alliance.

Parliamentary career

National Council of Provinces
In 2009, Groenewald was elected as a permanent delegate to the National Council of Provinces from the North West. He was the sole Democratic Alliance politician in the provincial delegation. Between 2009 and 2014, he was a member of the following select committees: public services, women, children and people with disabilities, and labour and public enterprises. Groenewald was also a member of the Joint Committee on Delegated Legislation.

After the 2014 South African general election, he returned to the NCOP and served as a member of the following select committees: social services, communications and public enterprises, and education and recreation. Groenewald resigned from the NCOP on 11 November 2015. Chris Hattingh filled his seat.

National Assembly
On 12 November 2015, Groenewald was sworn in as a Member of the National Assembly of South Africa. He left parliament on 7 May 2019, as he was not a candidate for that year's general election.

References

Living people
Year of birth missing (living people)
Afrikaner people
People from North West (South African province)
Members of the National Assembly of South Africa
Members of the National Council of Provinces
Democratic Alliance (South Africa) politicians
21st-century South African politicians